The First Zeitun Resistance of 1862 was an armed conflict between the Armenians of Zeitun and the Ottoman Empire. Zeitun has for a long time been an autonomous, almost independent Armenian region within the Ottoman Empire. In the summer the Sultan of the Ottoman Empire tried to assert his dominance over the region to make the region under the control of him.

Resistance
The Armenians of Zeitun had historically enjoyed a period of high autonomy in the Ottoman Empire until the nineteenth century. In the first half of the nineteenth century, the central government decided to bring this region of the empire under tighter control and attempted to do this by settling Muslims in the villages around Zeitun.

References

Battles involving the Ottoman Empire
Conflicts in 1862